Idol School may refer to:

 Idol School (2014 TV series)
 Idol School (2017 TV series)